Ron Howard (born November 14, 1982) is an American former professional basketball player. He held the D-League all-time scoring record from March 2014 to December 2014.

High school career
Howard attended Whitney Young High School in Chicago, Illinois. As a senior, he averaged 17 points and five rebounds per game while earning All-Conference, All-City, All-Area and Special Mention All-State honors.

College career
As a freshman at Marquette, Howard played alongside future NBA players Dwyane Wade and Travis Diener. In 9 games, he averaged just 1.8 points per game.

In 2002, he transferred to Valparaiso and subsequently sat out the 2002–03 season due to NCAA transfer rules.

As a sophomore, he played 19 games, averaging 5.8 points, 1.6 rebounds and 1.4 assists per game.

As a junior, he earned second team All-Conference honors, as well as winning the Dick Koenig Assist Award and the Homer W. Drew Sr. Memorial Most Improved Player Award. In 31 games. he averaged 13.8 points, 4.4 rebounds, 3.7 assists and 1.4 steals per game.

As a senior, he again earned second team All-Conference honors. In 29 games, he averaged 13.1 points, 3.5 rebounds, 3.4 assists and 1.4 steals per game.

Professional career

2006–07 season
Howard went undrafted in the 2006 NBA draft. In October 2006, he joined the Hanzevast Capitals of the Netherlands for a try-out but was unsuccessful and left the next month.

In early 2007, he joined Trigueros de Ciudad Obregón of Mexico for the 2007 CIBACOPA season. As well as being an All-Star, he helped Trigueros win the 2007 championship.

2007–08 season
On November 1, 2007, Howard was selected by the Fort Wayne Mad Ants in the 7th round of the 2007 NBA D-League draft.

2008–09 season
On September 29, 2008, Howard signed with the Milwaukee Bucks. However, he was later waived by the Bucks on October 20, 2008. Later that month, he was re-acquired by the Mad Ants.

2009–10 season
In July 2009, Howard joined the New York Knicks for the 2009 NBA Summer League. On September 24, 2009, he signed with the Knicks. However, he was later waived by the Knicks on October 7, 2009. In November 2009, he was re-acquired by the Mad Ants. In March 2010, he left the Mad Ants.

In April 2010, he signed with Marinos de Anzoátegui for the 2010 LPB season.

2010–11 season
In July 2010, Howard re-joined the New York Knicks for the 2010 NBA Summer League. In September 2010, he signed with Barak Netanya of Israel for the 2010–11 season. In November 2010, he left Netanya after just 3 games.

On December 15, 2010, he signed with the Adelaide 36ers for the rest of the 2010–11 NBL season. On February 23, 2011, he was released by the 36ers due to an ankle injury. In 11 games, he averaged 8.8 points, 2.1 rebounds and 1.4 assists per game.

On March 14, 2011, he was re-acquired by the Mad Ants.

2011–12 season
On September 20, 2011, Howard was re-acquired by the Mad Ants.

On December 10, 2011, he signed with the Milwaukee Bucks. However, he was later waived by the Bucks on December 19, 2011. He then returned to the Mad Ants.

2012–13 season
In October 2012, Howard was re-acquired by the Mad Ants.

On February 4, 2013, Howard was named to the Futures All-Star roster for the 2013 NBA D-League All-Star Game. On April 16, 2013, he received the 2013 NBA D-League Jason Collier Sportsmanship Award.

2013–14 season
In July 2013, Howard joined the Indiana Pacers for the Orlando Summer League (did not play for them) and the NBA D-League Select Team for the Las Vegas Summer League. On September 10, 2013, he signed with the Pacers but was later waived on October 17, 2013. In November 2013, he was re-acquired by the Fort Wayne Mad Ants.

On February 3, 2014, Howard was named to the Prospects All-Star roster for the 2014 NBA D-League All-Star Game. On March 29, 2014, in a game against the Springfield Armor, Howard broke the NBA D-League career scoring record, surpassing the previous mark by Renaldo Major (4,252 points). Howard finished the game with 20 points, bringing the new record to 4,261.

On April 18, 2014, he received the 2014 NBA D-League Jason Collier Sportsmanship Award. Six days later, Howard and Othyus Jeffers were named the co-MVPs of the NBA D-League for the 2013–14 season. On April 26, the Mad Ants claimed their first D-League championship as they defeated the Santa Cruz Warriors 2–0.

Howard completed the 2013–14 season with 4,324 career points. In December 2014, Renaldo Major re-claimed the scoring record.

2014–15 season
In July 2014, Howard re-joined the NBA D-League Select Team for the 2014 NBA Summer League. On March 3, 2015, he signed with Piratas de Quebradillas of Puerto Rico for the 2015 BSN season.

2015–16 season
In July 2015, Howard was selected by the Seoul Samsung Thunders with the final pick in the 2015 Korean Basketball League draft. In December 2015, he parted ways with Seoul after appearing in 27 games. Over that time, he averaged 7.1 points, 1.5 rebounds and 2.0 assists per game.

2016–17 season
On November 6, 2016, Howard signed with French team Élan Béarnais Pau-Lacq-Orthez as an injury replacement for Yannick Bokolo. He appeared in five games for the team before Bokolo returned to the line-up in early December.

Jersey retirement

On March 3, 2017, Howard had his No. 19 jersey retired by the Mad Ants, at halftime of the team's 106–94 win over the Westchester Knicks at Memorial Coliseum. Howard, who led the Mad Ants to the 2014 D-League Championship and was Co-MVP of the league, is the first player to be bestowed the honor.

Personal
Howard is the son of Lorri Howard

References

External links
Ron Howard at nbadleague.com
"Becoming Mr. Mad Ant" at nba.com
"Ron Howard's Jersey To Be Retired" at nba.com

1982 births
Living people
Adelaide 36ers players
American expatriate basketball people in Australia
American expatriate basketball people in France
American expatriate basketball people in Israel
American expatriate basketball people in Mexico
American expatriate basketball people in South Korea
American men's basketball players
Barak Netanya B.C. players
Basketball players from Chicago
Suwon KT Sonicboom players
Élan Béarnais players
Fort Wayne Mad Ants players
Goyang Carrot Jumpers players
Jeonju KCC Egis players
Marinos B.B.C. players
Marquette Golden Eagles men's basketball players
Piratas de Quebradillas players
Seoul Samsung Thunders players
Shooting guards
Small forwards
Trigueros de Ciudad Obregón players
Valparaiso Beacons men's basketball players